Catherine Hernandez is a Canadian writer, whose debut novel Scarborough was a shortlisted finalist for the 2017 Toronto Book Awards and the 2018 Edmund White Award.

She has also written the plays The Femme Playlist, Singkil, Eating with Lola, Kilt Pins and Future Folk, and the children's book M for Mustache: A Pride ABC. She has been the artistic director of the Sulong and b_current theatre companies in Toronto.

Of mixed Filipino, Chinese, Spanish and Indian descent, she identifies as queer.

Her second novel, Crosshairs, was published in 2020.

Scarborough was adapted by Shasha Nakhai and Rich Williamson into the film Scarborough, which premiered at the 2021 Toronto International Film Festival. Hernandez won the Canadian Screen Award for Best Adapted Screenplay at the 10th Canadian Screen Awards for the film's screenplay.

The novel was subsequently selected for the 2022 edition of Canada Reads, where it was defended by Malia Baker.

References

External links

 Author's website

21st-century Canadian dramatists and playwrights
21st-century Canadian novelists
Canadian women dramatists and playwrights
Canadian women novelists
Canadian children's writers
Canadian theatre directors
Queer writers
Canadian LGBT dramatists and playwrights
Canadian LGBT novelists
Canadian writers of Asian descent
Canadian people of Filipino descent
Canadian people of Chinese descent
Canadian people of Spanish descent
Canadian people of Indian descent
Writers from Toronto
Living people
21st-century Canadian women writers
Year of birth missing (living people)
21st-century Canadian LGBT people
Best Screenplay Genie and Canadian Screen Award winners
Canadian artistic directors
Canadian women screenwriters
21st-century Canadian screenwriters
Canadian LGBT screenwriters
Queer screenwriters
Queer dramatists and playwrights